The 2005 Pro Tour season was the tenth season of the Magic: The Gathering Pro Tour. On 10 September 2004 the season began with Grand Prix Rimini. It ended on 4 December 2005 with the conclusion of the 2005 World Championship in Yokohama and was thus the longest Pro Tour season ever. The season consisted of 31 Grand Prixs and 7 Pro Tours, held in Columbus, Nagoya, Atlanta, Philadelphia, London, Los Angeles, and Yokohama. At the end of the season Kenji Tsumura was proclaimed Pro Player of the year as the first Japanese player. Also the first class of the Hall of Fame was inducted. The inductees were Jon Finkel, Darwin Kastle, Tommi Hovi, Alan Comer, and Olle Råde.

Grand Prixs – Rimini, Vienna, Austin 

GP Rimini (10–11 September)
Format: Standard
Attendance: 750
 Domingo Ottati
 Florian Pils
 Giovanni Gesiot
 Luka Gasparac
 Davide Ghini
 Jan Brodzak
 Andrea Paselli
 Luca Cialini

GP Vienna (9–10 October)
Format: Rochester Draft
Attendance: 979
 Nicolaus Eigner
 Antoine Ruel
 René Kraft
 Sasha Zorc
 Sebastian Aljiaj
 Daniele Canavesi
 Dario Minieri
 Stefan Jedlicka

GP Austin (9–10 October)
Format: Rochester Draft
Attendance: 386
 Jonathan Sonne
 Eugene Levin
 Chris Prochak
 Gerry Thompson
 Jim Finstrom
 Neil Reeves
 Michael Jacob
 Mike Thompson

Pro Tour – Columbus (29–31 October 2004) 

Pierre Canali from France won the inaugural Pro Tour of the season, which was also the first Pro Tour he attended. His deck was an aggressive all-artifact deck called "Affinity". For the first time Japan had three players amongst the final eight while the USA had in the Top 8 for the first time in three Pro Tours.

Tournament data 
Prize pool: $200,130
Players: 286
Format: Extended
Head Judge: Jaap Brouwer

Top 8

Final standings

Pro Player of the year standings

Grand Prixs – Helsinki, Brisbane, Yokohama, Porto Alegre, Paris, Chicago, Osaka 

GP Helsinki (6–7 November)
Format: Rochester Draft
Attendance: 455
 Olivier Ruel
 Mikko Leiviskä
 Jean Charles Salvin
 Ulrik Tarp
 Anton Jonsson
 Wenzel Krautmann
 Pavlos Akritas
 Erkki Siira

GP Brisbane (13–14 November)
Format: Rochester Draft
Attendance: 222
 Will Copeman
 Anatoli Lightfoot
 Masami Ibamoto
 Andrew Grain
 Tom Hay
 Andrew Varga
 Jarrod Bright
 Bryce Trevilyan

GP Yokohama (20–21 November)
Format: Rochester Draft
Attendance: 707
 Kazuki Katou
 Tomohiro Kaji
 Akira Asahara
 Koutarou Ootsuka
 Masahiko Morita
 Rei Hashimoto
 Takashi Akiyama
 Ren Ishikawa

GP Porto Alegre (20–21 November)
Format: Rochester Draft
Attendance: 342
 Jose Barbero
 Gabriel Caligaris
 Mauro Kina
 Rafael Mendonça
 Guilherme Fonseca
 Paulo Vitor Damo da Rosa
 Renato Wholers
 Adilson de Oliveira

GP Paris (27–28 November)
Format: Rochester Draft
Attendance: 1594
 Wilco Pinkster
 Bastien Perez
 Wessel Oomens
 Raphael Lévy
 Giuseppe Reale
 Arnost Zidek
 Stephan Meyer
 Jean-Baptiste Gouesse

GP Chicago (18–19 December)
Format: Team Limited
Attendance: 474 (158 teams)
1. :B
 Timothy Aten
 Gadiel Szleifer
 John Pelcak
2. Gindy's Sister's Fan Club
 Adam Chambers
 Zach Parker
 Charles Gindy
3. The Max Fischer Players
 Igor Frayman
 Joshua Ravitz
 Chris Pikula
4. Voracious Cobra
 Bob Allbright
 Mike Hron
 Paul Artl

GP Osaka (8–9 January)
Format: Team Limited
Attendance: 480 (160 teams)
1. P.S.2
 Masashiro Kuroda
 Katsuhiro Mori
 Masahiko Morita
2. FireBall.Pros
 Jin Okamoto
 Tsuyoshi Ikeda
 Itaru Ishida
3. Gatas Brilhantes
 Ichiro Shimura
 Shu Komuro
 Tomohide Sasagawa
4. One Spin
 Tomohiro Kaji
 Kenji Tsumura
 Tomoharu Saitou

Pro Tour – Nagoya (28–30 January 2005) 

Pro Tour Nagoya was the last Pro Tour employing the Rochester Draft format. Shu Komuro from Japan defeated Anton Jonsson in the finals to win the tournament.

Tournament data 
Prize pool: $200,130
Players: 236
Format: Rochester Draft (Champions of Kamigawa)
Head Judge: Collin Jackson

Top 8

Final standings

Pro Player of the year standings

Grand Prixs – Boston, Eindhoven, Seattle 

GP Boston (5–6 February)
Format: Extended
Attendance: 699
 Masashi Oiso
 Lucas Glavin
 Keith McLaughlin
 Benjamin Dempsey
 Osyp Lebedowicz
 Masahiko Morita
 Anthony Impellizzierei
 Daniel O'Mahoney-Schwartz

GP Eindhoven (26–27 February)
Format: Extended
Attendance: 1012
 Sebastien Roux
 Rogier Maaten
 Xuan-Phi Nguyen
 Tobias Radloff
 Kamiel Cornelissen
 Michael Leicht
 Petr Nahodil
 Bas Postema

GP Seattle (5–6 March)
Format: Extended
Attendance: 390
 Ernie Marchesano
 Taylor Putnam
 Shuhei Nakamura
 Max McCall
 Grant Struck
 John Ripley
 Tsuyoshi Fujita
 Ryan Cimera

Pro Tour – Atlanta (11–13 March 2005) 

The Canadian French cooperation team "Nova" won Pro Tour Atlanta, defeating the American team "We Add" in the final. "Nova" consisted of Gabriel Tsang, David Rood, and Gabriel Nassif. For Nassif it was the first Pro Tour victory after five previous final day appearances including three second places. Atlanta was the last Pro Tour using the three-person team Limited format, although it was still used for the team competition at the World Championship that year and the next.

Tournament data 

Players: 357 (119 teams)
Prize Pool: $200,100
Format: Team Kamigawa Block Sealed (Champions of Kamigawa, Betrayers of Kamigawa) – first day, Team Kamigawa Block Rochester Draft (Champions of Kamigawa-Betrayers of Kamigawa) – final two days
Head Judge: Sheldon Menery

Top 4

Final standings

Pro Player of the year standings

Grand Prixs – Singapore, Leipzig, Lisbon, Detroit 

GP Singapore (19–20 March)
Format: Extended
Attendance: 373
 Itaru Ishida
 Shih Chien Chang
 Ichirou Shimura
 Yeung Sun Kit
 Dennis Yuliadinata
 Shu Komuro
 Oliver Oks
 Gabriel Kang

GP Leipzig (26–27 March)
Format: Sealed and Booster Draft
Attendance: 899
 Rustam Bakirov
 Rosario Maij
 Max Bracht
 Niki Jedlicka
 Philip Fetzer
 Sune Ellegard
 Bernardo Da Costa Cabral
 Mateusz Dabkowski

GP Lisbon (23–24 April)
Format: Sealed and Booster Draft
Attendance: 1169
 Marcio Carvalho
 Luis Sousa
 Mikael Polgary
 David Blazquez
 Joao Martins
 Pierre-Jerome Meurisse
 Marco Manuel
 Anton Jonsson

GP Detroit (23–24 April)
Format: Sealed and Booster Draft
Attendance: 491
 Jordan Berkowitz
 Richard Hoaen
 Michael Krumb
 Jeroen Remie
 Osyp Lebedowicz
 William Postlethwait
 Sam Gomersall
 Patrick Sullivan

Pro Tour – Philadelphia (6–8 May 2005) 

Pro Tour Philadelphia featured a tournament system different from those of other Pro Tours. While Swiss system was still used all players with three or more losses and/or draws were automatically dropped from the tournament. Prizes were given out not in relation to the final standings, but for the individual matches won, where matches in later rounds of the tournament were worth more than those in the earlier rounds. It was also announced in the week prior to Pro Tour Philadelphia, that the end of the year payout based on Pro Points would be dropped after the season in favor of the Pro Club. Under the new system a player would receive special benefits based on the total number of Pro Points he had acquired in a season.

16-year-old Gadiel Szleifer defeated 18-year-old Kenji Tsumura in the final to win the tournament. Former Pro Player of the year Kai Budde received a lot of attention for being undefeated after day one, but was eliminated after he picked up three losses in the first three rounds of day two.

Tournament data 

Players: 311
Prize Pool: $194,898
Format: Kamigawa Block Constructed (Champions of Kamigawa, Betrayers of Kamigawa)
Head Judge: Mike Guptil

Top 8

Final standings

Pro Player of the year standings

Grand Prixs – Matsuyama, Bologna 

GP Matsuyama (14–15 May)
Format: Sealed and Booster Draft
Attendance: 420
 Akira Asahara
 Masashi Oiso
 Kentarou Nonaka
 Takayuki Toochika
 Osamu Fujita
 Shuhei Nakamura
 Tomoharu Saitou
 Jun'ya Takahashi

GP Bologna (11–12 June)
Format: Sealed and Booster Draft
Attendance: 654
 Olivier Ruel
 David Brucker
 Giulio Barra
 Leonard Barbou
 Tomas Klimes
 Quentin Martin
 Bruno Panara
 Marco Castellano

Pro Tour – London (8–10 July 2005) 

Geoffrey Siron from Belgium won Pro Tour London, defeating Tsuyoshi Fujita in the finals. In the Top 8 Siron did not lose a single game.

Tournament data 

Players: 314
Prize Pool: $200,130
Format: Booster Draft (Champions of Kamigawa-Betrayers of Kamigawa-Saviors of Kamigawa)
Head Judge: Jaap Brouwer

Top 8

Final standings

Pro Player of the year standings

Grand Prixs – Minneapolis, Niigata, Taipei, Salt Lake City, Mexico City, Nottingham 

GP Minneapolis (16–17 July)
Format: Block Constructed
Attendance: 404
 Alex Lieberman
 Mark Herberholz
 Dustin Marquis
 Adam Yurchick
 Celso Zampere
 Andrew Stokinger
 Gerry Thompson
 Sean Inlow

GP Niigata (23–24 July)
Format: Block Constructed
Attendance: 476
 Katsuhiro Mori
 Tomohiro Aridome
 Akira Asahara
 Masashi Oiso
 Takuya Oosawa
 Kenji Tsumura
 Ryouma Shiozu
 Suhan Yun

GP Taipei (6–7 August)
Format: Block Constructed
Attendance: 261
 Osamu Fujita
 Masahiko Morita
 Jun'ichirou Bandou
 Shu Komuro
 Tai Chi Huang
 Aik Seng Khoo
 Masashi Oiso
 Masahiro Kuroda

GP Salt Lake City (27–28 August)
Format: Block Constructed
Attendance: 250
 Antonino De Rosa
 Karl Briem
 Kenji Tsumura
 Mark Ioli
 Frank Karsten
 Gadiel Szleifer
 Gabe Walls
 Rogier Maaten

GP Mexico City (3–4 September)
Format: Block Constructed
Attendance: 305
 Julien Nuijten
 Edgar Leiva
 Frank Karsten
 Maximiliano Liprandi
 William Postlethwait
 Gerard Fabiano
 Daniel Fior
 Rasmus Sibast

GP Nottingham (3–4 September)
Format: Block Constructed
Attendance: 560
 Nikola Vavra
 Roel van Heeswijk
 Nikolaus Eigner
 Philip Reich
 Jean Charles Salvin
 Ricard Tuduri
 Jure Trunk
 Alfred Benages

Pro Tour – Los Angeles (28–30 October 2005) 

Antoine Ruel defeated Billy Moreno in the finals to become champion of Pro Tour Los Angeles. He played a blue-black control deck, built around Psychatog.

Tournament data 

Players: 340
Prize Pool: $200,130
Format: Extended
Head Judge: Gijsbert Hoogendijk

Top 8

Final standings

Pro Player of the year standings

Grand Prixs – Melbourne, Copenhagen, Kitakyuushuu, Philadelphia, Bilbao, Beijing 

GP Melbourne (5–6 November)
Format: Extended
Attendance: 140
 James Zhang
 Paul Chalder
 Tim He
 David Zhao
 Andrew Vance
 Hugh Glanville
 Ben Fleming
 Sam Atkinson

GP Copenhagen (5–6 November)
Format: Extended
Attendance: 340
 Julien Nuijten
 Kim Valori
 Alexandre Rathcke
 Wessel Oomens
 Olivier Ruel
 Pasi Virtanen
 Bodo Rösner
 Nikolaos Lahanas

GP Kitakyuushuu (5–6 November)
Format: Extended
Attendance: 272
 Tomohiro Kaji
 Ryo Ogura
 Makihito Mihara
 Masashi Oiso
 Masahiko Morita
 Jin Okamoto
 Itaru Ishida
 Akira Asahara

GP Philadelphia (12–13 November)
Format: Legacy
Attendance: 495
 Jonathan Sonne
 Chris Pikula
 Pasquale Ruggiero
 Tom Smart
 Paul Serignese
 Pat McGregor
 Ben Goodman
 Lam Phan

GP Bilbao (19–20 November)
Format: Extended
Attendance: 938
 Olivier Ruel
 Marcio Carvalho
 Geoffrey Siron
 Jacob Arias Garcia
 Rogier Maaten
 Jonathan Rispal
 Gonzalo Domingo
 Sergi Herrero

GP Beijing (26–27 November)
Format: Extended
Attendance: 159
 Dong Zhong
 Masashi Oiso
 Olivier Ruel
 Katsuhiro Mori
 Li Gong Wei
 Tomoharu Saitou
 Ming Da Tsai
 Kenji Tsumura

2005 World Championships – Yokohama (30 November – 4 December 2005) 

The tournament began with the first Hall of Fame induction ceremony. Jon Finkel, Darwin Kastle, Tommi Hovi, Alan Comer and Olle Råde were honored for their accomplishments and their determination to the game. In the final of the 2005 World Championship Katsuhiro Mori defeated Frank Karsten, thus completing an all-Japanese Worlds in Yokohama. The Top 4 also included Japanese players Akira Asahara and Tomohiro Kaji, shortly before Japan had won the team competition, and even the Pro Player of the year went to Japanese Kenji Tsumura.

Tournament data 

Prize pool: $208,130 (individual) + $195,000 (national teams)
Players: 287
Formats: Standard, Booster Draft (Ravnica), Extended
Head Judge: Collin Jackson, Sheldon Menery

Top 8

Final standings

National team competition 

  Japan (Ichiro Shimura, Takuma Morifuji, Masashi Oiso)
  United States (Jonathan Sonne, Antonino De Rosa, Neil Reeves)

Pro Player of the year final standings 

After the World Championship Kenji Tsumura was awarded the Pro Player of the year title as the first Japanese player.

References 

Magic: The Gathering professional events